Legacy: The Greatest Hits Collection is a 2001 greatest hits LP for R&B group Boyz II Men, released by Universal Records.

Track listing

Original album
 "Motownphilly" from Cooleyhighharmony
 "It's So Hard to Say Goodbye to Yesterday" from Cooleyhighharmony
 "End of the Road"  from Boomerang and Cooleyhighharmony (reissue)
 "In the Still of the Nite (I'll Remember)" from The Jacksons: An American Dream Original Soundtrack and Cooleyhighharmony (reissue)
 "Hey Lover" (LL Cool J featuring Boyz II Men)  LP version from LL Cool J's Mr. Smith
 "I'll Make Love to You"  from II
 "On Bended Knee"  from II
 "Water Runs Dry"  from II
 "One Sweet Day" (Mariah Carey & Boyz II Men)  from the Mariah Carey LP Daydream
 "Doin' Just Fine"  from Evolution
 "4 Seasons of Loneliness" from Evolution
 "A Song for Mama" from Evolution
 "Pass You By"  from Nathan Michael Shawn Wanya

Deluxe edition
Disc one - Original Album
14. "Please Don't Go" (Bonus Track) from Cooleyhighharmony
15. "Uhh Ahh" (Bonus Track)  from Cooleyhighharmony
16. "Thank You" (Bonus Track)  from II
17. "Brokenhearted" (Soul Power mix, with Brandy) (Bonus Track) (from the "Brokenhearted" CD Maxi-Single) - 4:30 

Disc two -  Remixes, Movies & More
 "Motownphilly" (12" version) (from the "Motownphilly" U.S. Maxi CD Single) - 5:40 
 "Sympin'" (Extended Remix) (from the "Symphin' (Remix)" Maxi CD Single - 5:00 
 "Uhh Ahh" (The Sequel Mix) (from the "Uhh Ahh" CD Maxi-Single)
 "Thank You" (Moog Flava Mix) (from the "Thank You" U.S. Maxi CD Single)
 "I'll Make Love to You" (Make Love to You Mix)
 "On Bended Knee" (Human Rhythm Mix) (from the "On Bended Knee" U.S. Maxi CD Single)
 "Water Runs Dry" (Strat Mix) (from the "Water Runs Dry" U.S. Maxi CD Single)
 "Vibin'" (Cool Summer Mellow Mix) (from the "Vibin'" U.S. Maxi CD Single)
 "I Remember" (from the "I Remember" CD Single) - 4:41 
 "Doin' Just Fine" (Soul Solution Radio Version)
 "Can't Let Her Go" (Timbaland Remix) (from the "Can't Let Her Go" CD Maxi-Single) 
 "Visions of a Sunset" (Shawn Stockman solo from Mr. Holland's Opus)
 "Your Home Is in My Heart" (Stella's Love Theme, with Chanté Moore) (Single Edit) (from How Stella Got Her Groove Back)
 "I Will Get There" (Inspirational Version) (from The Price of Egypt [Inspirational])
 "Not Me" (from Elton John & Tim Rice's "Aida")
 "So Amazing" (from the score to the motion picture The Hurricane)
 "It's So Hard to Say Goodbye to Yesterday" (Legacy Deluxe Edition Version) (Exclusive) - 4:05

Charts

Weekly charts

Year-end charts

Certifications

References

External links
 
Allmusic.com
Discogs.com - "I Remember"
Discogs.com - "Sympin'" - remix

Boyz II Men compilation albums
Albums produced by Dallas Austin
Albums produced by Tim & Bob
Universal Records remix albums
2001 remix albums
2001 greatest hits albums